Rune Nergaard (born 26 May 1983 in Bodø, Norway) is a Norwegian jazz musician (upright bass), known from bands like Bushman's Revenge, Marvel Machine, Scent of Soil, and Team Hegdal.

Career 
Nergaard was educated on the jazz program at Trondheim Conservatory of Music (2003). He has been recognized through his collaboration with many of the most up-and-coming Norwegian musicians and bands.

Discography 

Within Bushman's Revenge
2007: Cowboy Music (Jazzaway Records)
2009: You Lost Me at Hello (Rune Grammofon)
2010: Jitterbug (Rune Grammofon)
2012: A Little Bit of Big Bonanza (Rune Grammofon) 
2012: Never Mind The Botox (Rune Grammofon)
2013: Electric Komle – Live! (Rune Grammofon)
2013: Thou Shalt Boogie! (Rune Grammofon)
2016: Jazz, Fritt Etter Hukommelsen (Rune Grammofon)
2016: Bushman's Fire (Rune Grammofon), live LP with Kjetil Møster and David Wallumrød

Within Team Hegdal
2010: Vol 1 (Øra Fonogram)
2011: Vol 2 (Øra Fonogram)

Within Montée
2014: Into The Fray (Sony Music, Norway)

With other projects
2007: Silent Sunday (Magica Records), with Marita Røstad
2011: Scent of Soil (Hubro), with Tore Brunborg, Kirsti Huke, Petter Vågan & Gard Nilssen

References

External links 
Rune Nergaard at Groove.no
Montée Official Website

1983 births
Living people
Musicians from Skien
Musicians from Bodø
Jazz double-bassists
Norwegian jazz upright-bassists
Male double-bassists
Norwegian jazz composers
Avant-garde jazz musicians
Norwegian University of Science and Technology alumni
Hubro Music artists
21st-century double-bassists
21st-century Norwegian male musicians
Bushman's Revenge members